Dr. Beronda Montgomery is a writer, science communicator, and researcher. In 2022, she moved to Grinnell College as professor of biology and vice president for academic affairs and dean of the college. Prior to Grinnell, Montgomery served as Michigan State University Foundation Professor in the Departments of Biochemistry & Molecular Biology and of Microbiology & Molecular Genetics. She was also a member of the MSU-DOE Plant Research Laboratory. Her research group investigates how photosynthetic organisms adapt to changes in their environment. Her scholarship extends beyond biology and into studying mentorship and faculty development to develop evidence-based strategies to foster equity and inclusion in academia. Together with Tanisha Williams and other members of the Black Botanists Week organizing committee, Montgomery co-founded and co-organizes Black Botanists Week.

Education and early career 
Montgomery received her bachelor's degree in biology from Washington University in St. Louis and her master's degree in biology from University of Central Arkansas. She then went on to complete her PhD in Plant Biology in 2001 at the University of California, Davis. She later became a postdoctoral fellow in Microbial Biology at Indiana University with the support of a National Science Foundation (NSF) award. In 2004, she joined the faculty at Michigan State University where she remained through spring semester of 2022.

Academic leadership 
Montgomery served as assistant provost for faculty development from 2016 to 2020 at MSU with responsibility for supporting all faculty and academic staff in the areas of research, scholarship, and creative activities. Since fall of 2020, she was appointed as interim assistant vice president for research and innovation at MSU in 2020. From 2021 - 2022, she served as assistant vice president for research and innovation. As of April 2022, Montgomery was named associate vice president for strategic initiatives and operations at MSU and served in that capacity until her departure from MSU at the end of the spring semester in 2022. 

Since July 1, 2022, Montgomery serves as Vice President for Academic Affairs and Dean of the College at Grinnell College in Iowa.

Research 
Montgomery's research centers on the dynamic molecular mechanisms that allow photosynthetic organisms—from cyanobacteria to plant species—to adapt and respond to changes in their photoenvironment. These organisms must respond to changes in light sources in order to continue photosynthesis, so they've developed finely tuned growth and developmental responses. Montgomery's lab studies a number of molecules that play an important role in this process, including light-absorbing pigments and light-sensing receptors, or phytochromes. In particular, her group works to better understand how these molecules regulate cell morphology and physiology in response to different environments and stressors, focusing their attention on Arabadopsis organ systems and cyanobacteria as model organisms.

As of July 2022, Montgomery is Professor of Biology and Dean of the College at Grinnell College. Until June of 2022, Montgomery held the title of MSU Foundation Professor in recognition of her scholarly accomplishments, disciplinary development, commitment to creativity, and teaching excellence. Her research contributions have been recognized by the American Academy of Microbiology when she was elected as a fellow in 2018, the American Association for the Advancement of Science when she was elected as a fellow in 2020, the American Society of Plant Biologists when she was elected as a fellow in 2021, and the American Society for Biochemistry and Molecular Biology when she was elected as fellow in 2022.

Patent applications 
Montgomery has submitted two patent applications alongside her colleagues John Clark Lagarius, Takayuki Kochi, Nicole Frankenberg and Gregory A. Gambetta. Submitted in 2001, WO2001094548A2 involved the isolation and characterisation of a family of bilirubin reductases that could be applied as part of a synthetic pathway in the manufacture of phytochromes. Submitted in 2002, WO2002097137A1 involved the use of light to control the movement of phytochromes within a cell as a mechanism to transport polypeptides into the cell nucleus.

Mentorship 
Montgomery also conducts scholarship and training initiatives on mentoring, particularly around issues relating to mentoring and retaining students and junior scientists from underrepresented backgrounds. She has published extensively on evidence-based strategies to nurture and retain talent in academia, developing strategies for effective mentorship that center on the individual and their specific needs and goals. Montgomery has also worked with her colleagues to create sustainable opportunities for career development and enhancement. For instance, she has worked with the American Society for Microbiology to connect research scientists with students in the classroom, with the support of the National Science Foundation. With that funding, Montgomery and her collaborators have established the ASM-NSF Leaders Inspiring Networks and Knowledge (LINK) program, to build "links" between research investigators, students, and educators. She also served six years as Chair of the ASM Watkins Graduate Research Fellowship, which is aimed at increasing the number of underrepresented groups completing their doctoral degrees in microbiology. Montgomery's efforts have also focused on faculty development to ensure that mentees grow into effective mentors for the next generation and continue attracting and promoting underrepresented students through STEM careers.

As an expert in effective and evidence-based mentorship, Montgomery serves on a number of leadership boards and as a consultant to universities working towards greater diversity, equity, and inclusion within their research and education programs. She was formerly an advisory board member of 500 Women Scientists, lending her expertise in mentorship and faculty development to support their mission of making science open, inclusive, and accessible.

Book
Her book, Lessons from Plants, Harvard University Press, April 2021 draws analogies between plant biology and daily life experiences.

Awards and honors
 National Science Foundation CAREER Award, 2007
Michigan State University Foundation Professorship, 2016
 American Society for Microbiology Distinguished Lecturer, 2017-2019
American Academy of Microbiology Fellow, 2018
John Wiley Jones Distinguished Lecturer, 2019
Cell Press CrossTalk's 100 Inspiring Black Scientists in America List, 2020
Union of Concerned Scientists Science Defender, 2020
American Association for the Advancement of Science, Elected Fellow, 2020
Ritter Memorial Lecturer, 2021
NSF BIO Distinguished Lecturer, 2021
Botanical Society of America, Recipient, Charles Edwin Bessey Teaching Award, 2021
American Society of Plant Biologists, Elected Fellow, 2021
GardenComm [Garden Communicators International], Honoree, Cynthia Westcott Scientific Writing Award, 2021 
American Society for Cell Biology, Recipient, Mentoring Keynote Award, 2021
American Society for Biochemistry and Molecular Biology, Elected Fellow, 2022
American Society for Microbiology, Recipient, Honorary Diversity Lecturer Award, 2022
American Society of Plant Biologists, Recipient, Adolph E. Gude, Jr. Award, 2022

References 

Year of birth missing (living people)
Living people
American women scientists
University of California, Davis alumni
Michigan State University faculty
21st-century American botanists
American microbiologists
Washington University in St. Louis alumni
Science communicators
African-American scientists
Women biologists
21st-century American women
Grinnell College faculty
Women microbiologists